The Kingston Centre (originally Kingston Shopping Centre) was an indoor mall built in Kingston, Ontario in 1955 and demolished in 2004.

Anchored by the Loblaws supermarket, the current Kingston Centre is, like its predecessor, located beside a Canadian Tire store and bordered by Sir John A. Macdonald Blvd, Bath Road and Princess Street.

History
The Kingston Shopping Centre was built in 1955 and anchored by Simpsons-Sears (later Sears Canada) department store. It was located at 1100 Princess Street in what was then the west end of the city, and served as one of two main transfer points for all Kingston Transit routes and the starting point for the city's annual Santa Claus parade. Originally an outdoor mall, it was converted to an enclosed indoor mall in 1970-71, and once boasted 78 stores including the two-storey Sears and a Loblaws supermarket.

The Kingston Shopping Centre retained the title of largest shopping centre in the area until the Cataraqui Town Centre was constructed in 1982 in the former Kingston Township. Before then, its closest rival was the Frontenac Mall, built in 1967 as Kingston's first enclosed mall with 57 stores, anchored by Woolco.

Kingston Shopping Centre's retail traffic, once brisk, sharply declined after the relocation of Sears to the  Cataraqui Town Centre in 1999. The Loblaws supermarket, relocated into a new building constructed on the site of the former Sears store, became sole anchor. This move, combined with the disappearance of smaller department stores including Biway Stores, Family Fair, Marks and Spencer, Zellers and Woolworth, left Kingston Shopping Centre without a department store anchor. With one end of the mall a grocery store, the opposite end of the mall (which originally held Loblaws and a food court) was left as an empty ghostbox and eventually boarded up; it was the first section to be razed during the demolition of the remaining indoor mall building in 2004.

Fewer than a dozen retail tenants remained at the time of demolition: a barber shop, a health food store, two banks, a grocery store, a drugstore, a camera store and a restaurant. These businesses were moved to new buildings constructed in what had been the parking lot of the original indoor mall and remain in operation.

The former department store site is currently occupied by the Loblaws grocery store building, with the rest of the greyfield re-used for new retail construction or left vacant. No part of the original mall structure remains. A large portion of land at the south-western section of the property, vacated by demolition of the original mall, is as yet undeveloped.

The area near the mall includes a large number of apartment buildings built in the 1960s and '70s, with a high percentage of senior citizen residents who made up a large portion of the mall's clientele.  Some have complained that the site is "not as pedestrian-friendly as they (the developers) guaranteed it was going to be."

Bus terminal

Kingston Centre Transfer Point is located in the heart of the shopping centre and is a major transfer point for Kingston Transit. It is the terminus for daytime routes 2, 3, 11 and 12 with routes 4 and 16 passing through. Routes 501/502 and 701/702 also connect with the Kingston Centre through nearby road stops.

Anchors & majors
Loblaws
Canadian Tire
Rexall Pharma Plus

See also
 Princess Street (Kingston, Ontario)

References

Kader, M. The Transit Village: A Case Study of Kingston Centre. Kingston, Ontario: School of Urban and Regional Planning, Queen's University.

Bus stations in Ontario
Shopping malls in Ontario
Shopping malls established in 1955
2004 disestablishments in Ontario
Buildings and structures in Kingston, Ontario
1955 establishments in Ontario
Buildings and structures demolished in 2004